Associazione Sportiva Dilettantistica Unione Polisportiva Comunale Tavagnacco, also known as Graphistudio Tavagnacco for sponsorship reasons, is an Italian women's football club from Tavagnacco, Friuli-Venezia Giulia.

History 
Founded in 1989, by 2001 UPC Tavagnacco reached the Serie A, where it has played since. After struggling to avoid relegation in its first years in Serie A, the club has joined the championship's elite in recent years, ranking between the 2nd and 6th positions since 2007. In 2011 Tavagnacco was league runner up and it also reached the Italian Women's Cup final, which it lost 0–3 to Torres Calcio. It consequently qualified for the first time for the UEFA Champions League, where it was defeated in the Round of 32 by Swedish champion LdB Malmö.

Honours
 Serie A
Runner-up: 2011, 2013
 Coppa Italia
Winner: 2012/13, 2013/14

Overall competition record

UEFA competition record

Current squad

Former players
For details of current and former players, see :Category:U.P.C. Tavagnacco players.

Staff
Management:
 Chairman: Roberto Moroso
 Sports director: Glauco Di Benedetto
 Secretary: Paolo Foschiani
 Marketing director: Luigi Gressani

Sports:
 Head coach: Sergio Tomadini 
 Assistant coach: Marco Rossi
 Goalkeeper coach: Alessandro Pinat

Medical:
 Physio: Sara Pozzetto

References

External links 
 Club's website
 Club at UEFA.com

Women's football clubs in Italy
Sport in Friuli-Venezia Giulia
1989 establishments in Italy
Association football clubs established in 1989